Konstantinos Skenderis was a Greek journalist and author. He was born in Korça, modern southeast Albania, when the city was under Ottoman rule. From 1910 he published the newspaper named O Pelasgos ( The Pelasgian)

When his homeland came under Greek administration (Oct. 1914 – Sept. 1916), Skenderis got elected as member of the Greek Parliament for the Korytsa Prefecture in the following elections (December 1915). From 1916 he lived in Athens where he continued to publish his newspaper until 1940.

References

External links
Ιστορία της αρχαίας και συγχρόνου Μοσχοπόλεως [History of Moscopole.] K. Skenderis. (Greek)
Issues of 'Pelasgos' , . (Greek)

Northern Epirus independence activists
Greek journalists
Greek MPs 1915–1917
Greek writers
Year of death missing
Year of birth missing
People from Korçë